Vapniarka is a village in Ukraine, Odesa Oblast, Odesa Raion. Vapniarka has a population of 731.

Until 18 July 2020, Kryzhanivka belonged to Lyman Raion. The raion was abolished in July 2020 as part of the administrative reform of Ukraine, which reduced the number of raions of Odesa Oblast to seven. The area of Lyman Raion was merged into Odesa Raion.

Population Census 

As of January 12, 1989, Vapnyarka had a population of 743. 333 men and 410 women.

As of December 5, 2001, Vapnyarka had a population of 729.

Language Distribution 

Vapnyarka's language distribution.

Localities near Vapnyarka 

List of Localities near Vapnyarka within the 50 km range.

References 

Villages in Odesa Raion